Simon Krogh (born 27 March 1980) is a Danish handballer, currently playing for Danish Handball League side Skjern Håndbold. He has previously played for league rivals Fredericia HK.

External links
 Simon Krogh

1980 births
Living people
Danish male handball players